Busega District is one of the five districts of Simiyu Region of Tanzania, East Africa. Its administrative centre is the town of Nyashimo.
It is bordered to the north by Lake Victoria and Bunda District, to the east by Bariadi District, and to the south by Magu District.

As of 2012, the population of Busega was 203,597. Busega was established in 2012, when it was split off from Magu District and became part of the newly established Simiyu Region.

Transport
Busega district is connected by two well-maintained and paved national trunk roads. The Mwanza-Musoma highway (trunk road T4) runs through the district from south to north. The highway that connects Shinyanga Region and Mara Region (trunk road T36) branches of the Musoma-Mwanza road in the town of Lamadi in Busega District and passes through the regional capital Bariadi.

Tourism
Because of its proximity to the western 'Ndabaka' gate of Serengeti National Park there are several lodges in the northern part of Busega District, that provide accommodation to tourists who visit the park.

Administrative subdivisions

Wards
As of 2012, Busega District was administratively divided into 13 wards.

2012 wards
The 15 wards in 2012:

 Badugu
 Igalukilo
 Kabita
 Kalemela
 Kiloleli
 Lamadi
 Lutubiga
 Malili
 Mkula
 Mwamanyili
 Ngasamo
 Nyaluhande
 Shigala
Nyashimo Ward
Imalamate

References

Districts of Simiyu Region